Lycée Georges Clemenceau may refer to the following French schools:
Lycée Georges-Clemenceau - Champagne-sur-Seine
Lycée Georges Clemenceau - Chantonnay
 - Montpellier
Lycée Georges Clemenceau (Nantes)
 - Reims
Cité Scolaire Georges Clemenceau Sartène - Sartène
Lycée Georges Clemenceau - Villemomble (Paris area)